Purifier(s) may refer to:
 Air purifier, a device that filters pollution out of the air
 Water purification, removing contaminants from water, sometimes using a water purifier
 The Purifiers, a 2004 action film
 Purifiers (Marvel Comics), a fictional terrorist organization